Leslie Paul Miller (born  March 1, 1965) is a former professional American football defensive end who played 12 seasons in the National Football League for the San Diego Chargers, the New Orleans Saints, and the Carolina Panthers. He played college football at Kansas State and Fort Hays State, where he earned AP Little All-American honors.

References

External links

1965 births
Living people
People from Arkansas City, Kansas
Players of American football from Kansas
American football defensive tackles
Kansas State Wildcats football players
Fort Hays State Tigers football players
San Diego Chargers players
New Orleans Saints players
Carolina Panthers players